Gonzalagunia mollis is a species of plant in the family Rubiaceae. It is endemic to Ecuador. It is critically endangered and its population trend is unspecified by the IUCN Red List.

References

Sources
 

mollis
Endemic flora of Ecuador
Critically endangered flora of South America
Taxonomy articles created by Polbot